Tess Madgen (born 12 August 1990) is an Australian professional basketball player. She currently plays for the Melbourne Boomers in the WNBL. She is also a member of the Australian Opals.

Madgen was a member of the Australian Women's basketball team (Opals) at the 2020 Tokyo Olympics. The Opals were eliminated after losing to the USA in the quarterfinals.

Personal
Madgen was born 12 August 1990 in Barossa Valley, South Australia, where she lived while growing up. In 2011, she was attending the University of South Australia.

She was featured in the WNBL's 2009 league calendar.

She is the sister of former South East Melbourne Phoenix and Boomers guard, Ben Madgen and sister of Collingwood Magpies player Jack Madgen

Basketball
Madgen plays guard and forward and is an offensive player. In 2008, she was featured as a basketball star on myFiba.

Madgen played junior basketball for the Eastern Mavericks. She has been affiliated with the South Australian Institute of Sport. She competed at the 2004 and 2005 Australian U16 Championships, playing for South Australia Country. She competed at the 2006 and 2007 Australian U18 Championships, playing for South Australia Country. In 2007, she played for Barossa Valley. She competed at the 2007 and 2008 Australian U18 Championships, playing for South Australia Country. In 2008, her team finished first, beating Victoria 99–61 for one of the biggest wins ever in the competition's history. As a competitor at the 2009 Australian Under-20 national championships, she won the Bob Staunton Award while her team took home silver.

WNBL
Madgen had a scholarship with the Australian Institute of Sport in 2008 and 2009. She played with the AIS team in the 2008/2009 and 2009/2010 WNBL seasons. She was one of three South Australians on the team. In a November 2008 90–62 loss to the Adelaide Lightning, she scored few points. In a November 2009 game against the Adelaide Lightning which her side lost 77–100, she had 15 points and 13 rebounds. In a 101–49 loss for her team to the Sydney Uni Flames, she scored 11 points.

Madgen joined the Bendigo Spirit for the 2010/2011 season where she averaged 16 points a game in the regular season and finished third in the league in this category. She finished fifth in the league for 3-point shooting percentage at 36% in the regular season.  She had 125 total rebounds in the season. According to teammate and team General Manager Kirsti Harrower, Madgen learned to become a team player in her first season with the club. Three weeks into the season, she was named the league's player of the week. In the third round in a game against the Australian Institute of Sport at the AIS Basketball and Netball Training Hall, she scored 28 points, with a field goal percentage of 75%. She also had four steals in the game. In a November 2010 game against the Adelaide Lightning, she scored 25 points 7 rebounds in a 91–79 win for the Spirit. She was named the club's most valuable player at the end of the season.

Madgen resigned with the team for the 2011/2012 season in June 2011 and was with Bengido in the 2011/2012 season. She was named the club's Most Valuable Player. In January 2012, she made a clutch shot for her team that helped them beat Canberra. In the Canberra game, she scored 14 points. Spirit coach Bernie Harrower said of efforts to re-sign her: "There’s no doubt about that. She’s probably on most people’s shopping list. She is very unlucky to miss out on the Opals squad this year and she’s been able to do that by playing with us. For her to play in Bendigo she’s not playing behind anyone else, she’s the superstar of our team. If she goes to Bulleen there’s certainly people ahead of her there, and she then has to take a step backwards. You do what you can to keep your players and if they’re not happy playing with you and want to move on, well there’s not much you can do about that. She’s certainly a required player for us and someone we desperately want to keep." She did not resign with Bendigo for the 2012/2013 season. Bulleen was believed to have been trying to recruit her to play for them as some of their players had played with Madgen on the Australian Institute of Sport team, including Liz Cambage and Rachel Jarry.

National team
Madgen made her international debut in 2008 with the Australian junior team, earning a gold medal with them at the Oceania World Qualification series. That year, she was also part of the junior national team that won a silver medal at the William Jones Cup in Taiwan. In 2009, she was a member of the Australian junior women's team that competed at the World Championships in Thailand. She has also represented Australia at the 2011 Summer Universiade in Shenzen, China in August, where Australia took home a bronze medal, beating 66–56 in the bronze medal match. The quarter final victory over Canada, she scored 14 points.  She also scored eight points in games against Japan and the Czech Republic. She was selected for the team in June 2011.

Madgen was named to the 2011 Opals squad and made her national team debut in 2011 as a member of the team in the lead up to the 2011 FIBA Oceania Championships, playing in the Olympic qualification series against New Zealand women's national basketball team.  In the series, she played 22 minutes off the bench in game two, scored nine points and had 5 rebounds. She earned a gold medal in the 2011 FIBA Oceania Championship. She was selected for the squad to compete at the 2011 Chinese hosted Women's 4 Nations Tournament. In late July 2011, she played in a three-game test series against China played in Queensland. She was the youngest player on the squad. She was named to the 2012 Australia women's national basketball team.

Madgen, like all the other members of the 2020 Tokyo Olympics Opals women's basketball team, had a difficult tournament. The Opals lost their first two group stage matches. They looked flat against Belgium and then lost to China in heartbreaking circumstances. In their last group match the Opals needed to beat Puerto Rico by 25 or more in their final match to progress. This they did by 27 in a very exciting match. However, they lost to the United States in their quarterfinal 79 to 55.

See also

 List of Australian WNBA players

References

External links

Profile at Eurobasket.com

1990 births
Living people
Australian expatriate basketball people in Poland
Australian expatriate basketball people in the United States
Australian Institute of Sport basketball (WNBL) players
Australian women's basketball players
Basketball players at the 2020 Summer Olympics
Forwards (basketball)
Guards (basketball)
Medalists at the 2011 Summer Universiade
Medalists at the 2013 Summer Universiade
Melbourne Boomers players
Olympic basketball players of Australia
Phoenix Mercury players
South Australian Sports Institute alumni
Townsville Fire players
Universiade bronze medalists for Australia
Universiade medalists in basketball
University of South Australia alumni